Dan Doona is a Gaelic footballer from Beaufort, County Kerry. He currently is a member for the New York county team and has been captain of the team since 2010. He played for Kerry at all levels winning Munster Minor Football Championship medals in 2002 and 2003.

In 2008 he was liked with a move to join up with Mick O'Dwyer's Wicklow but stayed in New York.

At club level he played with Beaufort & Mid Kerry before moving to New York. He won 2 Kerry Minor Football Championship medals with Mid Kerry in 2002 and 2003. In New York he has played with both the Kerry and Leitrim teams, winning Championships with both (2006 with Kerry and 2010 and 2011 with Leitrim).

References
 http://hoganstand.com/ArticleForm.aspx?ID=88835
 http://hoganstand.com/ArticleForm.aspx?ID=94522
 http://hoganstand.com/kerry/ArticleForm.aspx?ID=13642
 http://hoganstand.com/kerry/ArticleForm.aspx?ID=13585
 http://www.terracetalk.com/kerry-football/player/82/Dan-Doona

Year of birth missing (living people)
Living people
Beaufort Gaelic footballers
Kerry inter-county Gaelic footballers
Kerry New York Gaelic footballers
Leitrim New York Gaelic footballers
New York inter-county Gaelic footballers